Batanes's at-large congressional district refers to the lone congressional district of the Philippines in the province of Batanes. Batanes has been represented in the country's various national legislatures since 1898. The first congressional delegation consisted of two members in the First Philippine Republic legislature known as the Malolos Congress. Since 1909 when it was re-established as a regular province separate from Cagayan, Batanes has been entitled to one member in the House of Representatives of the Philippines, elected provincewide at-large, except for a brief period between 1943 and 1944 when it was again eliminated and absorbed by Cagayan's at-large representation for the National Assembly of the Second Philippine Republic. From 1978 to 1984, all provinces were converted into multi-seat regional at-large districts for the Interim Batasang Pambansa of the Fourth Philippine Republic, with Batanes forming part of the seven-seat Region II's at-large district. It was restored as a single-member district in 1984.

The district is currently represented in the 18th Congress by Ciriaco B. Gato Jr. of the Nationalist People's Coalition (NPC).

Representation history

Election results

2022

2019

2016

2013

2010

See also
Legislative districts of Batanes

References

Congressional districts of the Philippines
Politics of Batanes
1898 establishments in the Philippines
1909 establishments in the Philippines
At-large congressional districts of the Philippines
Congressional districts of Cagayan Valley
Constituencies established in 1898